Samara Heavrin is an American politician from Kentucky. She is a Republican and represents District 18 in the State House.

References

External links
 Official website

Living people
Republican Party members of the Kentucky House of Representatives
Women state legislators in Kentucky
21st-century American politicians
21st-century American women politicians
Year of birth missing (living people)